Surintendante de la Maison de la Reine ("Superintendent of the Queen's Household"), or only Surintendante, was the senior lady-in-waiting at the royal court of France from 1619 until the French revolution. The Surintendante was selected from the members of the highest French nobility.

History
The office was created in 1619. The Surintendante and the Governess of the Children of France were the only female office holders in France to give an oath of loyalty to the King himself. 

The surintendante had about the same tasks as the Première dame d'honneur: receiving the oath of the female personnel before they took office and supervising them and the queen's daily routine, as well as organizing the accounts and staff list, but she was placed in rank above the première dame d'honneur. Whenever the surintendante was absent, she was replaced by the première dame d'honneur. The post of surintendante could be left vacant for long periods, and was abolished between the death of Marie Anne de Bourbon in 1741 and the appointment of Princess Marie Louise of Savoy in 1775. 

During the Second Empire, the Grande-Maitresse was the equivalent of the Surintendante, being formally the highest female official at court but in practice with the same tasks as the dame d'honneur.

List of Surintendante de la Maison de la Reine to the queen of France

Surintendante to Anne of Austria 1619-1666

 1619-1637: Marie de Rohan
 1657-1666: Anne Marie Martinozzi, Princess of Conti

Surintendante to Maria Theresa of Spain 1660-1683

 1660-1661: Anne Gonzaga
 1661-1679: Olympia Mancini, Countess of Soissons
 1679-1683: Françoise-Athénaïs, marquise de Montespan

Surintendante to Marie Leszczyńska 1725-1768

 1725-1741: Marie Anne de Bourbon
 1741-1768: Abolished

Surintendante to Marie Antoinette 1775-1792

 1775-1792: Princess Marie Louise of Savoy

See also
 Mistress of the Robes, British equivalent 
 Camarera mayor de Palacio, Spanish equivalent 
 Chief Court Mistress, Dutch, German, Scandinavian and Russian equivalent

References

Ancien Régime
Ancien Régime office-holders
Government of France
French monarchy
Court titles in the Ancien Régime
Gendered occupations